The United States Office of Management and Budget has defined the 12-county Denver–Aurora, CO Combined Statistical Area comprising the Denver–Aurora–Lakewood, CO Metropolitan Statistical Area, the Boulder, CO Metropolitan Statistical Area, and the Greeley, CO Metropolitan Statistical Area. The United States Census Bureau estimates that the population was 3,214,218 as of July 1, 2012, an increase of +3.99% since the 2010 United States Census, and ranking as the 16th most populous metropolitan combined statistical area and the 17th most populous primary statistical area of the United States. The population estimate for 2020 was 3,652,385.


Counties
The Denver–Aurora CSA comprises the Denver–Aurora–Lakewood, CO Metropolitan Statistical Area, the Boulder, CO Metropolitan Statistical Area, and the Greeley, CO Metropolitan Statistical Area. The table below includes the following information:

The name of the constituent Core Based Statistical Area (CBSA).
The population of the CBSA as of July 1, 2007, as estimated by the United States Census Bureau.
The population of the county as of July 1, 2014, as estimated by the United States Census Bureau.
The county population as of April 1, 2010, as enumerated by the 2010 United States Census, and 
The percent county population change from April 1, 2010, to July 1, 2014.
The population of the county as of July 1, 2016, as estimated by the United States Census Bureau.

Components
The Denver–Aurora, CO CSA includes the following jurisdictions in the State of Colorado:
Town of Alma
City of Arvada
Town of Ault
City of Aurora
Town of Bennett
The portion of the Town of Berthoud in Weld County
City of Black Hawk
City of Boulder
Town of Bow Mar
City of Brighton
City and County of Broomfield
City of Castle Pines North
Town of Castle Rock
City of Centennial
Central City
City of Cherry Hills Village
Town of Columbine Valley
City of Commerce City
City of Dacono
Town of Deer Trail
City and County of Denver
Town of Eaton
City of Edgewater
Town of Elizabeth
Town of Empire
City of Englewood
Town of Erie
City of Evans
Town of Fairplay
City of Federal Heights
Town of Firestone
City of Fort Collins
Town of Foxfield
Town of Frederick
Town of Garden City
Town of Georgetown
Town of Gilcrest
City of Glendale
City of Golden
City of Greeley
City of Greenwood Village
Town of Grover
Town of Hudson
City of Idaho Springs
Town of Jamestown
The portion of the Town of Johnstown in Weld County
Town of Keenesburg
Town of Kersey
Town of Kiowa
Town of La Salle
City of Lafayette
Town of Lakeside
City of Lakewood
Town of Larkspur
City of Littleton
Town of Lochbuie
City of Lone Tree
City of Longmont
City of Louisville
Town of Lyons
Town of Mead
Town of Milliken
Town of Morrison
Town of Mountain View
Town of Nederland
City of Northglenn
Town of Nunn
Town of Parker
Town of Pierce
Town of Platteville
Town of Raymer
Town of Severance
City of Sheridan
Town of Silver Plume
Town of Simla
Town of Superior
City of Thornton
Town of Ward
Town of Watkins
City of Westminster
City of Wheat Ridge
The portion of the Town of Windsor in Weld County
unincorporated Adams County
unincorporated Arapahoe County
unincorporated Boulder County
unincorporated Clear Creek County
unincorporated Douglas County
unincorporated Elbert County
unincorporated Gilpin County
unincorporated Jefferson County
unincorporated Park County
unincorporated Weld County

See also

Colorado
Outline of Colorado
Index of Colorado-related articles
List of places in Colorado
List of cities and towns in Colorado
List of census-designated places in Colorado
List of counties in Colorado
Colorado statistical areas
Front Range Urban Corridor
North Central Colorado Urban Area
Denver–Aurora, CO Combined Statistical Area
Denver–Aurora–Lakewood, CO Metropolitan Statistical Area

References

External links
US Census Bureau
Vintage 2014 US population estimates (Note: updated annually for most states)

Metropolitan areas of Colorado
Denver metropolitan area